Jean Colin (also Jean-Alphonse and Jean-Lambert-Alphonse; December 27, 1864 – December 30, 1917) was a French general and military writer. He has been judged "one of the brilliant members of the French General Staff before 1914."

Educated at the École polytechnique,
he worked in the history service of the army from 1900 to 1906. He served in World War I, was made a général de brigade in 1917 and was killed that year in Serbia.

He translated Clausewitz's Der Feldzug von 1796 in Italien (1859) as Études sur la campagne de 1796-1797 en Italie (1889).

His best known work is Les transformations de la Guerre (Paris, 1911), translated as France and the Next War or as Transformations of War by L.H.R. Pope-Hennessy (London, 1912). His criticisms of Napoleon and the offensive school were controversial.

Other works
 Les Campagnes du maréchal de Saxe (1901–1906)
 L'éducation militaire de Napoléon
 Louis XV et les Jacobites:  Le projet de débarquement en Angleterre de 1743–1744.  Paris:  Librairie Militarie R. Chapelot et Cie., 1901.

References

 The sword and the pen : selections from the world's greatest military writings, prepared by Sir Basil Liddell Hart ; edited by Adrian Liddell Hart. Crowell, NY, 1976.
Christopher Bassford, Clausewitz in English: The Reception of Clausewitz in Britain and America, 1815-1945 (New York: Oxford University Press, 1994). Ch. 10. 
http://www.ecole-superieure-de-guerre.fr/promotions/biographie/799

Colin, jean (general)
Colin, Jean (general)
Colin, Jean (general)
1917 deaths
1864 births
French male non-fiction writers